The 2001 EPD Tour was the fifth season of the EPD Tour, one of four third-tier tours recognised by the European Tour.

Schedule
The following table lists official events during the 2001 season.

Order of Merit
The Order of Merit was based on prize money won during the season, calculated in Euros. The top four players on the tour (not otherwise exempt) earned status to play on the 2002 Challenge Tour.

Notes

References

EPD Tour
European Tour